The ministerial exception, sometimes known as the "ecclesiastical exception," is a legal doctrine in the United States barring the application of anti-discrimination laws to religious institutions' employment relationships with its "ministers." As explained by the Supreme Court in the landmark case Hosanna-Tabor Evangelical Lutheran Church and School v. E.E.O.C., the exception is drawn from the First Amendment to the United States Constitution, and seeks to both (1) safeguard religious groups' "freedom . . . to select their own ministers," a principle rooted in the Free Exercise Clause, and (2) prevent "government involvement in [] ecclesiastical decisions," a prohibition stemming from the Establishment Clause. When applied, the exception operates to give religious institutions an affirmative defense when sued for discrimination by employees who qualify as "ministers;" for example, female priests cannot sue the Catholic church to force their hiring. However, exactly which types of employees should qualify as a "ministers," and thus how broadly the exception should apply, was the subject of recent litigation before the Supreme Court.

Doctrinal foundation

Pre-Hosanna-Tabor 
The first application of the ministerial exception is traced to McClure v. Salvation Army, where the Fifth Circuit found in 1972 that an employee could not sue the Salvation Army for violations under Title VII of the Civil Rights Act, stating that the "application of Civil Rights Act provisions relating to equal employment opportunities to relationship of Salvation Army and its officer who was minister would result in encroachment by state into area of religious freedom in violation of First Amendment." While the McClure court reasoned that the text of Title VII could not be construed to allow such suits, later decisions by other lower courts have constitutionalized the exception.

In the years after McClure, with the Supreme Court having yet to weigh in, the constitutional foundations of the exception became widely debated by scholars. Professors Douglas Laycock, Ira Lupu, Robert W. Tuttle, and Christopher Lund, for example, argued that the exception was required by either the Free Exercise Clause, the Establishment Clause, or both, while others like Professor Caroline Corbin argued that First Amendment jurisprudence did not mandate the exception at all.

Hosanna-Tabor 
In 2012, in Hosanna-Tabor, the Supreme Court faced the ministerial exception for the first time. Writing for the majority, Chief Justice John Roberts affirmed the exception, grounding it in both the Free-Exercise and Establishment Clauses. The majority also found that it applied to the case at hand, barring Cheryl Perich, a teacher, from suing her employer, a Missouri Synod church and school, under the Americans with Disabilities Act (ADA). Although the court declined to adopt a "rigid formula" to determine who is a minister, it found compelling that Ms. Perich (1) was held out as a minister and given a formal ministerial title, (2) had undergone a "significant degree of religious training" in order to obtain that title, (3) held herself out as a minister, even claiming special housing allowances for ministers on her taxes, and (4) performed significant religious functions, including playing "a role in conveying the Church's message and carrying out its mission."

The entire court agreed with this outcome, but Justices Samuel Alito and Elena Kagan wrote separately to stress that the last factor the majority cited—whether the employee functions as a minister, including "those who serve in positions of leadership, those who perform important functions in worship services and in the performance of religious ceremonies and rituals, and those who are entrusted with teaching and conveying the tenets of the faith to the next generation"—should be the touchstone of the analysis. Otherwise, they feared that a strict application of the other factors would hinder religious traditions without concepts of ministerial status or ordination from claiming the exception. Justice Clarence Thomas also wrote separately, noting that his preferred standard for who should qualify as a minister would "defer to a religious organization's good-faith understanding."

Since Hosanna-Tabor, scholars have continued to debate the exception.

Recent litigation 

Even with the guidance of Hosanna-Tabor, lower courts have struggled with the standard for who should qualify as a minister. While some courts have hewed closer to Justice Alito and Kagan's function-centric standard, others have declined to apply the exception when employees like teachers function as ministers in some broad sense, but hold no other indicia of ministerial status. The Ninth Circuit has typified this approach. In Biel v. St. James School, in 2018, the court declined to use the exception to bar the disability-discrimination suit of an elementary school teacher who "taught religion for about thirty minutes a day, four days a week, using a workbook on the Catholic faith." The court held similarly in Morrissey-Berru v. Our Lady of Guadalupe School, in 2019, allowing a Catholic elementary school teacher's age discrimination suit to move forward.

Both the Biel and Morrissey-Berru decisions were appealed to the Supreme Court, which granted certiorari and consolidated the cases on December 18, 2019. Oral arguments were held via phone on May 11, 2020 due to the COVID-19 pandemic. While the schools (as well as the United States government as amicus curiae), argued that a single Hosanna-Tabor factor, namely performing important religious functions, should be sufficient to confer ministerial status upon an employee, the employees argued that the first three Hosanna-Tabor factors, the "objective" indicia of ministerial status, should be given priority, preventing religious institutions from using the exception to defend against suits from lay teachers. The issue has garnered some mainstream media attention, with Linda Greenhouse in particular writing multiple opinion columns in the New York Times highlighting the case. The Supreme Court ruled in a 7–2 decision on July 8, 2020 (called Our Lady of Guadalupe School v. Morrissey-Berru) that reversed the Ninth Circuit's ruling, affirming that the principles of Hosanna-Tabor, that a person can be serving an important religious function even if not holding the title or training of a religious leader, satisfied the ministerial exception in employment discrimination.

Potential future litigation 
In addition to cases like Biel and Morrissey-Berru, which aim to elucidate the scope of the term "minister" for the exception, there may also be future litigation seeking to clarify the scope of laws and regulations from which religious institutions are exempted. While suits under anti-discrimination statutes like Title VII and the ADA seem to be clearly barred by the exception, some lower courts have held that the ministerial exception can also be a defense to a broader array of employment claims, including to sexual harassment claims, to wage-and-hour claims under the Fair Labor Standards Act, and to breach of contract claims.

References